Londonderry (also called Derry) is a city in Northern Ireland.

Londonderry may also refer to:

Australia
 Cape Londonderry, the northernmost point of mainland Western Australia
Electoral district of Londonderry in New South Wales
Londonderry, New South Wales, a suburb of Sydney
 Londonderry, Western Australia, an abandoned town in Western Australia

Canada
Londonderry, Nova Scotia, an unincorporated community
Londonderry, Edmonton,  a residential area in northeast Edmonton, Alberta

Chile
Londonderry Island, an island and archipelago off Tierra del Fuego

England
Londonderry, North Yorkshire, a village near the Yorkshire Dales
Londonderry, West Midlands, an area in Sandwell, West Midlands

Northern Ireland
County Londonderry, or County Derry
Londonderry County Borough Council now called Derry City Council
Londonderry Port, the city's port
Londonderry Eglinton Airport now called City of Derry Airport
Londonderry County (Parliament of Ireland constituency)
Londonderry City (Parliament of Ireland constituency)
Londonderry (UK Parliament constituency) (historically focused on the county)
Londonderry City (UK Parliament constituency) (historically focused on the city)
East Londonderry (UK Parliament constituency), present-day parliamentary constituency
Londonderry (Northern Ireland Parliament constituency)
City of Londonderry (Northern Ireland Parliament constituency)
Londonderry (Assembly constituency)

United States
Londonderry, New Hampshire, a New England town
Londonderry (CDP), New Hampshire, the densely settled portions of the town
Londonderry, Guernsey County, Ohio, an unincorporated community
Londonderry, Ross County, Ohio, an unincorporated community
Londonderry, Vermont, a New England town
Londonderry (CDP), Vermont, a village in the town

Other uses
The Marquess of Londonderry
The Earl of Londonderry or Baron Londonderry
, two Royal Navy ships
Londonderry House, Mayfair, London
Londonderry Air, a musical air from County Londonderry
Annie Londonderry (1870–1947), the first woman to bicycle around the world

See also
 Londonderry Township (disambiguation)
 Derry (disambiguation)
 North Londonderry (disambiguation)
 East Londonderry (disambiguation)
 South Londonderry (disambiguation)
 List of Irish place names in other countries